Barlow Moor Road is a tram stop on the Airport Line of the Manchester Metrolink. It opened on 3 November 2014. and is on the Airport line on Mauldeth Road West next to the junction of Barlow Moor Road.

Services
Trams run every 12 minutes north to Victoria and south to Manchester Airport (every 20 minutes before 6 am).

References

External links

 Metrolink stop information
 Barlow Moor Road area map
 Light Rail Transit Association
 Airport route map

Tram stops in Manchester
Railway stations in Great Britain opened in 2014
2014 establishments in England